Ty (stylized as ty) is an American multinational corporation headquartered in Oak Brook, Illinois, a suburb of Chicago. It was founded by Ty Warner in 1986. It designs, develops and sells products, most notably Beanie Babies, exclusively to specialty markets worldwide.

Internet

First business-to-consumer Website
Ty was the first business to produce a direct-to-consumer website designed to engage their market.  This is a major contributing factor to the early and rapidly growing popularity of Beanie Babies.  By the time the first iteration of the Ty Web site was published in late 1995, only 14% of Americans were using the Internet. In tandem with the launch of the Ty Website, all Beanie Baby hangtags had the Ty Website URL and a call to action printed underneath the poems and birthdays that commanded audiences to visit the company Web site with text that read: Visit our web page!!! As a result, consumers were visiting the Ty Web site by the thousands to gain information about Beanie Babies, which was completely unprecedented at the time. Ty was the first business to leverage their Web site to connect and engage with consumers of their products. This effort evolved into the world's first Internet sensation.

Fundraising
Ty has been involved in a large amount of fundraising. Some has been through the sale of certain Beanie Babies, with the proceeds have been donated to various causes. It has also been through other means, such as voting for a fee.

One such fundraising Beanie Baby was Ariel, made to raise funds for the Elizabeth Glaser Pediatric AIDS Foundation. Its sales raised a total of $3.4 million for the foundation. Others include Aware and Awareness, sold to raise funds for breast cancer research and awareness; and Barbaro, created in memory of Barbaro the Horse, to raise funds for the University of Pennsylvania School of Veterinary Medicine, which tried to save the horse.

Ty has also raised money for the 2004 PGA Tour with a beanie called ChariTee; one, signed by Jack Nicklaus was auctioned for $455.

Ty was the shirt sponsor of Portsmouth FC from 2002 to 2005, in which the club was promoted to the Premier League.

A beanie baby named "Cito" was given out to school children in Montecito, California to welcome them back to school after the area was affected by the 2018 Southern California mudflows.

References

External links

AboutBeanies - Beanie Baby history and information

1986 establishments in the United States
Beanie Babies
Companies based in DuPage County, Illinois
Oak Brook, Illinois
Toy companies established in 1986
Toy companies of the United States